The Ewiges Meer is the largest raised bog lake in Germany, with an area of 91 hectares (0.91 km²). Its surface lies at about 8.5 metres above sea level (NN). The lake is surrounded by an extensive complex of unutilised areas, that exhibit the actual raised bog profile and, together with the lake, form the 1,180 hectare of Ewiges Meer Nature Reserve (Ewiges Meer und Umgebung).

Location 
The nature reserve lies on the border of the counties of Wittmund and Aurich near the village of Eversmeer in East Frisia. It belongs to the Nenndorf Raised Bog (Nenndorfer Hochmoor) on the shoulder of the Oldenburg-East Frisian Geest Ridge and forms the core zone of the roughly 33-square kilometre Großes Moor bog complex near Aurich.

See also 
 Lakes of Germany

Literature 
 Harm Poppen: Naturschutzgebiet Ewiges Meer. Verlag Cl. Mettcker & Söhne, Esens, 1991, .
 Ernst Andreas Friedrich: Naturdenkmale Niedersachsens. Landbuch-Verlag, Hanover, 1980, .

External links 

Website about the Ewiges Meer Nature Reserve
 
 Documentation on the condition and development of the most important lakes in Germany by TU Cottbus, Teil 4: Bremen und Niedersachsen (pdf, 500 kb)

Geography of East Frisia
Aurich (district)
Wittmund (district)
Nature reserves in Lower Saxony
Bogs of Lower Saxony
North German Plain